ATMP  is a chemical compound used as a chelator.

ATMP  may also refer to:

 Advances in Theoretical and Mathematical Physics, a peer-reviewed mathematics journal
 All Terrain Mobility Platform
 All Things Must Pass, an album by George Harrison
 Advanced Therapy Medicinal Product, a classification for medicinal products that are based on genes, cells or tissues